The Madeira evergreen forests is a laurissilva ecoregion of southwestern Europe. It covers the archipelago of Madeira and some nearby islands (Desertas and Selvagens) in the Atlantic Ocean. Laurel forest, known as laurissilva, once covered the islands. Over centuries the laurel forests were mostly cleared. Madeira's remaining forests are now protected.

Geography
The islands are an autonomous region of Portugal.

The islands are volcanic in origin. Basalt and volcanic ash are common substrate rocks, with some areas of uplifted limestone of marine origin. The volcanic soils are generally fertile, sustaining both the native forests and agriculture on the two larger islands.

The islands of Madeira and Porto Santo are inhabited. The archipelago has a population of 289,000 (2016 estimate), mostly on Madeira. Funchal, on Madeira's south shore, is the islands' largest city and principal port.

Climate
The climate of Madeira is subtropical and maritime. The average annual temperature ranges between 15 and 20°C at sea level. The climate becomes more temperate with elevation, and frost and snow occur most winters on Madeira's high elevations. Prevailing winds are from the northeast, and rainfall is higher on the windward north side of the island. The mountain slopes are frequently shrouded in orographic clouds and fog, sustaining cloud forests in the wettest areas.

Flora
Madeira has about 1,226 native species of vascular plants. 66 vascular plant species are endemic to the islands, including two endemic genera, Chamaemeles and Musschia. Madeiran endemics include Polystichum maderensis, Cerastium vagans, Armeria maderensis, Goodyera macrophylla, Viola paradoxa, Crambe fruticosa, Matthiola maderensis, Sinapidendron angustifolium, Saxifraga maderensis, Sorbus maderensis, Cytisus maderensis, Senecio maderensis, Phalaris maderensis, Pittosporum coriaceum, and Musschia wollastonii. Another 54 species are endemic to  Macaronesia. Over half of Madeira's plant species are also found in the Mediterranean Basin.

Before Madeira was settled, laurel forests, known as laurissilva covered most of the island. Laurissilva now covers 16 of the island, and is found between  elevation on the Madeira's wet north-facing slopes, and from  elevation on the south-facing slopes.

Laurissilva is characterized by evergreen trees with glossy leaves, and trees in the laurel family (Lauraceae) are prominent. The laurissilva is similar to the ancient subtropical forests of the Mediterranean Basin, prior to its climate cooling and drying during the ice ages. The paleobotanical record of Madeira reveals that laurissilva forests has existed in this island for at least 1.8million years. The Canary Islands and Azores are home to smaller areas of laurissilva.

The laurissilva of Madeira is of two main types. Moist laurisilva is found on north-facing slopes and canyons. The predominant trees are Laurus azorica, Ocotea foetens, Persea indica, and Clethra arborea. Trees are covered with epiphytic mosses and lichens.

Dry laurisilva is found on south-facing slopes, and predominant trees are Apollonias barbujana, Laurus azorica, Picconia excelsa, Visnea mocanera, and Clethra arborea.

Other laurissilva plants include the trees Heberdenia excelsa, Laurus nobilis, Pittosporum coriaceum, and Rhamnus glandulosa, and the large shrubs Ilex perado and Ilex canariensis. The laurissilva has an understory of shrubs, ferns, herbs, mosses, and liverworts. Understory plants include the giant cranesbill Geranium maderense, the Madeiran squill (Scilla madeirensis), and the endemic orchids Dactylorhiza foliosa and Goodyera macrophylla.

Mountain heathland grows on the high ridges and mountains above the laurissilva. Characteristic shrubs are tree heath (Erica arborea), besom heath (Erica platycodon ssp. maderincola), and Madeira juniper (Juniperus cedrus).

Along the southern coast, low forests dominated by the endemic wild olive tree (Olea europaea cerasiformis) and the shrubs Maytenus umbellata, Chamaemeles coriacea (a Madeiran endemic), Dracaena draco, and Asparagus scoparius survive in coastal ravines up to  elevation. A secondary coastal shrubland of Euphorbia piscatoria, Echium nervosum.  and Globularia salicina forms in disturbed areas. Low forests dominated by marmolano (Sideroxylon mirmulans) occur along the northern shore, and in pockets above the south shore Olea forests from  elevation. Other coastal plant communities include low shrubland, perennial grassland, and annual grassland.

Fauna
The laurissilva forests of the island of Madeira have been recognised as an Important Bird Area (IBA) by BirdLife International. Some 295 bird species and subspecies have been recorded on the Islands, and 42 of them breed here. Endemic bird species include the Trocaz pigeon (Columba trocaz), Zino's petrel (Pterodroma madeira), Desertas petrel (Pterodroma deserta), and Madeira firecrest (Regulus maderensis). The Madeiran chaffinch (Fringilla coelebs madeirensis) is an endemic forest subspecies of the common chaffinch. Berthelot's pipit (Anthus bertheloti) and Atlantic canary (Serinus canaria) are Macaronesian endemics. Tyto alba schmitzi is a Madeiran subspecies of Western barn owl, Accipiter nisus granti is a Macaronesian subspecies of Eurasian sparrowhawk, and Falco tinnunculus canariensis is a Macaronesian subspecies of common kestrel. The plain swift (Apus unicolor) breeds on Madeira and the Canary Islands, and ranges over northwestern Africa. Two extinct species of rail, the Madeira rail (Rallus lowei) and Porto Santo rail (Rallus adolfocaesaris), once inhabited the archipelago, on Madeira and Porto Santo islands respectively.

Zino's petrel is a Madeiran breeding endemic, and the Desertas petrel breeds only on the Desertas islands. Other seabirds include the Madeiran storm petrel (Oceanodroma castro), Fea's petrel (Pterodroma feae), little shearwater (Puffinus assimilis baroli), white-faced storm petrel (Pelagodroma marina hypoleuca), and yellow-legged gull (Larus michahellis). Regular visitors include the little egret (Egretta garzetta), cattle egret (Bubulcus ibis), Eurasian whimbrel (Numenius phaeopus), dunlin (Calidris alpina), and ruddy turnstone (Arenaria interpres).

Two bats inhabit the islands – the Madeira pipistrelle (Pipistrellus maderensis), a Macaronesian endemic, and a subspecies of lesser noctule (Nyctalus leisleri verrucosus).

The islands have two endemic lizards. The Madeiran wall lizard (Teira dugesii) lives on Madeira, Porto Santo, the Desertas, and the Selvagens.

The islands have over 500 terrestrial invertebrate species, including insects, spiders, and molluscs.

Human impacts
Portuguese settlers arrived after 1420, and are the first known settlers. The islands' trees were cut for their timber, and Persea indica was the most sought-after. In the 16th and 17th centuries the southern side of Madeira was converted to sugarcane plantations. Forests and shrublands were denuded to provide charcoal for the islands' sugar mills. Goats, sheep, and cows were introduced to the islands, and forests were converted to pasture land, and the forest understory was grazed intensively.

Many exotic plants and animals have been introduced to the islands. A few are invasive. Plantations of Pinus pinaster and Eucalyptus globulus were planted at middle elevations. Eucalyptus has spread extensively on the south slope of Madeira, displacing native species.

Conservation and protected areas
Approximately  of laurissilva remain on Madeira, mostly on the northern side of the island. 90% of the laurissilva is primary forest, and includes trees up to 800 years old that predate settlement of the islands. The remaining 10% is secondary growth in areas that were last cut during the mid-20th century.

 (60%) of the ecoregion is in protected areas. From the 1980s goats and sheep were removed from the forests and the non-forested areas of the park, which has allowed the forest understory and shrublands to recover.

The Selvagens were made a nature reserve in 1971, and the Desertas in 1990.

References

External links

Ecoregions of Portugal
Environment of Madeira
Macaronesia
Palearctic ecoregions
Temperate broadleaf and mixed forests
Important Bird Areas of Madeira